Love At Seventh Sight is a 2009 Hong Kong film.

Cast 
Mike He as Zi qi
Li Xiaolu as Yanqing/Baiye

References

Hong Kong romantic comedy films
2000s Hong Kong films